Bridal Veil Fall is a waterfall in Banff National Park, Alberta, Canada. It originates in the Huntington Glacier on the slopes of Cirrus Mountain. Its waters drain into Nigel Creek, then into the North Saskatchewan River at the Big Bend of the Icefields Parkway.

References

Banff National Park
Waterfalls of Alberta